Arthur Lynch (Mayor), 22nd Mayor of Galway, died 20 November 1507.

Lynch was a member of one of The Tribes of Galway, and was notable as the first of the Mayors of the town to die in office.

He was elected in August 1507 and sworn in the following month.

The circumstances of his death were as follows: accompanied by his bailiffs, Anthony Lynch and William Joyce, he was making his way home from an inn in an intoxicated state when they fell off the town's Great West Bridge and drowned in the Corrib.

It is not known who replaced him as mayor, but Stephen Lynch was Mayor of the term 1508–1509.

References
"History of Galway", James Hardiman, 1820
"Old Galway", Maureen Donovan O'Sullivan, 1942
 Henry, William (2002). Role of Honour: The Mayors of Galway City 1485-2001. Galway: Galway City Council.  
 Martyn, Adrian (2016). The Tribes of Galway: 1124-1642

Mayors of Galway
15th-century births
Year of birth missing
1507 deaths
16th-century Irish politicians
15th-century Irish politicians
People of the Tudor period